The Shukin is Ranchu-like goldfish developed from Ranchu and Oranda at the end of the 19th century in Japan.

Description
The Shukin (秋錦) has a body shaped like long type of Ranchu. But it also has a long tail fin like the Oranda.

Shukins come in red, red and white, white, blue, and silver.

History
The Shukin had been developed by Kichigoro Akiyama during 1892 to 1900 in Japan. It was wiped out once due to events in World War II, but has since been revived.

The Shukin is rare type of goldfish even in Japan, although the breed is becoming popular in the US with advanced hobbyists.

See also
Ranchu
Oranda

External links
Varieties of Goldfish - About Shukin
How To Take Care Of Goldfish